Exiguobacterium artemiae is a Gram-positive bacterium from the genus of Exiguobacterium which has been isolated from the shrimp Artemia franciscana.

References

Bacillaceae
Bacteria described in 2006